Miss Colombia (Formally Concurso Nacional de Belleza de Colombia, English: "National Beauty Contest of Colombia") is the national beauty pageant organization in Colombia.

The current Miss Colombia is Sofía Osío Luna of Atlántico, who was crowned on 14 November 2022.

Pageant rules

Colombia has rigid and strict rules regarding participation of any Miss Universe preliminary aspirant: once a contestant registers for the pageant, she is confined to her own Department and cannot move or relocate to other states/provinces. However, she can participate more than once for the same department. As example, the winner of 2003 had already come in fourth place at the Miss Valle pageant the year before she won and eventually went on to win the national title and crown.

Initially, the pageant's winners held the title for six months period; Yolanda Emiliani Roman, Miss Colombia 1934, held her title for the longest reign in the pageant's history. The winner of Senorita Colombia previously represented her country at Miss Universe, but will attend Miss International following a loss of the franchise in 2020. On occasion, when the winner does not qualify (such as due to age) for either contest, a runner-up finalist is selected by the national director and sent.

Titleholders

Colombia representatives at International pageants
The following women have represented Colombia in the international pageants.

Señorita Colombia – Internacional

Began in the 90s, the 1st Runner-up of Señorita Colombia represents her country at Miss International.

Señorita Colombia – Supranacional

Since 2017, Señorita Colombia has been in charge of selecting the Colombian representative for Miss Supranational. In 2022, The winner of Señorita Colombia represents her country at Miss Supranational

Señorita Colombia – Grand International

Past franchises

Señorita Colombia – Universo

The winner of Señorita Colombia represents her country at Miss Universe. On occasion, when the winner does not qualify (due to age) for either contest, a runner-up is sent. Since 2020, the election of Miss Universe Colombia took over the franchise of Miss Universe in Colombia.

Señorita Colombia – Mundo

From 1968 to 1990, the National Beauty Contest of Colombia organisation were the license holders, and the Colombian representative to Miss World. Began 1991 the election of Miss Colombia Mundo Org. took over the franchise of Miss World in Colombia.

Controversies

David Letterman on Miss Colombia
In May 2001, David Letterman joked about the 'special talent' which the then-reigning Miss Colombia Andrea Noceti possessed – that she was able to "swallow 50 balloons full of heroin" for the (non-existent) talent competition in the Miss Universe 2001 pageant. The remark not only infuriated the beauty queen, but also the people in Colombia.

Miss Colombia openly threatened to sue Letterman but later withdrawn the statement after Letterman formally apologised to her in the Late Show with David Letterman about the quip made. Letterman had invited the beauty queen to appear on his show as a gesture of appeasement.

Sponsors 
Some of the Miss Colombia Beauty Contest include jewelries like Joyeria Casareo and André Laurent Joyeria, media companies like RCN TV and Cromos Magazine and beauty companies like Jolie de Vogue and Leonisa.

See also 

 Miss International
 Miss Supranational
 Reina Hispanoamericana
 Reina Mundial del Banano
 Miss Universe Colombia
 Miss Mundo Colombia
 Miss Grand Colombia
 Miss Earth Colombia

References and footnotes

External links
Official site: Concurso Nacional de Belleza – srtacolombia.org
Pageantopolis.com: Lists of Miss Colombia Universe Delegates and Placements
Pageantopolis.com: Lists of Miss Colombia International Delegates and Placements
Miss Colombia History

 
Colombia
Colombia
Colombia
Miss
Colombian awards